Keller Brothers Airport  is a privately owned, public-use airport  south of Lebanon, in Lebanon County, Pennsylvania.

References

External links 

 http://www.airnav.com/airport/08N
 https://www.aeroswag.com/airport/pennsylvania/keller-brothers-airport/08N

Airports in Lebanon County, Pennsylvania